HIV Scotland is a registered charitable organisation based in Edinburgh, Scotland,  established in 1995 as Scottish Voluntary HIV & AIDS Forum, that works to make policy and advocacy changes for people living with HIV in Scotland, PrEP users, and people at risk of HIV.


History 

HIV Scotland was set up as the Scottish Voluntary HIV and AIDS Forum in September 1994, a crucial stage in the development of Scotland’s response to HIV, some 12 years into the epidemic. The organisation’s establishment by leading figures in the third and HIV sectors was a response to the Scottish Office AIDS Task Force call for improved provision and coordination of services. Roy Kilpatrick was the founding CEO until 2011.

George Valiotis was the Chief Executive Officer of HIV Scotland between 2011 and 2018 during which a key achievement was a successful implementation strategy for a new technology called HIV pre-exposure prophylaxis (PrEP), for which the organisation was awarded the British Medical Association Medfash prize for making Scotland the first nation in the UK to have it listed on their national health service.

Nathan Sparling was chief executive between 2018 and 2020, and helped lead the organisation through a strategic review which led to their new 11-year Strategic Plan - #ZEROHIV. He announced he was leaving HIV Scotland in December 2020. 

Alastair Hudson is the currently the Interim Chief Executive Officer, appointed in 2021.

References 

Charities based in Scotland
HIV/AIDS organisations in the United Kingdom
Organisations based in Edinburgh
Organizations established in 1995
1995 establishments in Scotland